Discosis is the second album by Canadian group Bran Van 3000, released in 2001. The album features several collaborators, including Curtis Mayfield, Youssou N'Dour, Jean Leloup and reggae artist Eek-a-Mouse. The album cover was derived from an artwork by Boris Vallejo. The album debuted at #5 on the Canadian Albums Chart, selling 9,236 copies during its first week. The album featured the single "Astounded", which was a hit in Canada. Discosis was among the top 150 best-selling albums of 2001 in Canada.

Track listings
 "Astounded" (feat. Curtis Mayfield) – 5:57
 "Loop Me" – 3:10
 "Montréal" (feat. Youssou N'Dour) – 4:11
 "BV3" – 0:57
 "Discosis" (feat. Big Daddy Kane, Dimitri From Paris) – 3:24
 "Go Shoppin'" (feat. Eek-A-Mouse) – 2:43
 "More Shopping" (feat. Momus) – 3:02
 "The Answer" (feat. Dizzy D, Summer Rose)- 4:04
 "Jean Leloup's Dirty Talk" (feat. Jean Leloup) – 1:09
 "Loaded" (feat. Big Daddy Kane) – 3:25
 "Speed" – 5:24
 "Predictable" – 4:44
 "Senegal" (feat. Youssou N'Dour) – 2:25
 "Dare I Say" (feat. Jean Leloup) – 3:59
 "Stepchild" (feat. Badar Ali Khan)- 4:33
 "Love Cliché" – 4:00
 "Rock Star" – 3:28
 "Astounded" (Demon Mix) – 8:23

Year-end charts

References

2001 albums
Bran Van 3000 albums
Virgin Records albums
Grand Royal albums